Osborne is a former provincial electoral division in the Canadian province of Manitoba.  It was created by redistribution in 1957, and was abolished in 1999.

The riding was located in south-central Winnipeg.  When it was abolished, most of its territory was given to the new ridings of Fort Rouge and Lord Roberts.

List of provincial representatives

Election Results

References

Former provincial electoral districts of Manitoba
Politics of Winnipeg